Koduvayur may refer to:

 Koduvayur-II, a village in Palakkad district, Kerala, India
 Koduvayur (gram panchayat), a gram panchayat in Palakkad district